Esches station (French: Gare d'Esches) is a railway station located between the communes of Amblainville and Esches (Oise department), France.  It is served by TER Hauts-de-France trains from Paris-Nord to Beauvais.

See also 
 List of SNCF stations in Hauts-de-France

References

Railway stations in Oise